Per Sandahl Jørgensen (born 2 August 1953) is a Danish former cyclist, who competed in the individual road race event at the 1980 Summer Olympics. He currently works as a directeur sportif for UCI Continental team .

References

External links
 

1953 births
Living people
Danish male cyclists
Olympic cyclists of Denmark
Cyclists at the 1980 Summer Olympics
People from Skive Municipality
Sportspeople from the Central Denmark Region